Ikh-Uul is the name of two sums (districts) in Mongolia:
 Ikh-Uul, Khövsgöl
 Ikh-Uul, Zavkhan